Hyocrinida is an order of sea lilies which contains a single extant family, Hyocrinidae.

Characteristics
Members of this order have long slender stems consisting of a large number of identical columnar units. There are no cirri, and the basal disc of the stem attaches directly to the substrate. The calyx is globular or conical, and consists of five widely-spaced, undivided arms attached to five radial ossicles.

Distribution

Most hyocrinids are found at depths below , in the range , in all the ocean basins and on seamounts.

References

 
Articulata (Crinoidea)